HMS Unity was a U-class submarine, of the first group of that class constructed for the Royal Navy. The submarine entered service in 1938 and performed war patrols during the Second World War. On 29 April 1940, Unity was accidentally rammed and sunk in Blyth, Northumberland's harbour.

Construction and career
Unity was built by Vickers Armstrong, Barrow-in-Furness. She was laid down on 19 February 1937 and was commissioned on 5 October 1938.

At the onset of the Second World War, Unity was a member of the 6th Submarine Flotilla. From 26–29 August 1939, the flotilla deployed to its war bases at Dundee and Blyth.

She rescued the survivors of Dutch fishing vessel Protinus on 25 March 1940.

Sinking
Unity sailed from Blyth on 29 April 1940 to patrol off Norway, where she collided with the Norwegian ship Atle Jarl, sinking five minutes later. Two members of her crew, Lieutenant John Low and able Seaman Henry Miller, gave their lives by remaining behind in the flooded control room so that their shipmates could escape from the sinking vessel.

Wreck

References

Sources
 
 
 
 

 

British U-class submarines
Ships built in Barrow-in-Furness
1938 ships
World War II submarines of the United Kingdom
Submarines sunk in collisions
World War II shipwrecks in the North Sea
Shipwrecks of Northumberland
Maritime incidents in April 1940